Macrobaenetes kelsoensis is a species of insect in family Rhaphidophoridae known commonly as the Kelso giant sand treader cricket. It is endemic to California, where it is known only from San Bernardino County.

References

External links

Endemic fauna of California
Rhaphidophoridae
Taxonomy articles created by Polbot
Insects described in 1962